Traghan or Traghen is a small town in the Murzuk Desert in Murzuq District in southwest Libya. It is located east of Murzuk and Zizau. A good high road is said to link Traghan to Zizau in the west, with frequent incrustations of salt.

History
Traghan by the 13th century was dominated by the Saifawa dynasty, a remarkable feat as Traghan lies 1380 kilometres from Njimi, the Saifawa capital. The Saifawa were said to have "gained control of the Fezzan by establishing a post in the oasis of Traghan about twenty miles east of modern Murzuk and some seventy miles west-south-west of ancient Zawila."

Traghan was approached by western explorers on 29 November 1822. In the late 1820s, Traghan was described as was formerly as considerable a place as Murzuk; and was, about sixty years ago, the residence of a sultan, who governed eastern Fezzan. It was described as being in a flat, desert plain, with gardens and date groves. It contained four mosques with small mud minarets and the houses were mostly large but in ruin. The population in the late 1820s was estimated to be 500-600 but it had previously been far more populous. Major Denham noted that the people of Traghan were exceptionally skilled in carpet making and their carpets rivaled those of Constantinople. Hugh Murray later noted its fine carpets in the early 1850s.

The town was the site of a battle between the Libyan National Army and Chadian militants in 2018 during the Second Libyan Civil War.

References

Populated places in Murzuq District
Sahara
Baladiyat of Libya